Cold in July may refer to:

 Cold in July (novel), a 1989 crime novel
 Cold in July (film), a 2014 American crime drama